Lemaire Channel is a strait off Antarctica, between Kyiv Peninsula in the mainland's Graham Land and Booth Island.

It was first seen by the German expedition of 1873-74, but not traversed until December 1898, when the Belgica of the Belgian Antarctic Expedition passed through. Expedition leader Adrien de Gerlache named it for Charles Lemaire (1863-1925), a Belgian explorer of the Congo.

The channel has since become a standard part of the itinerary for cruising in Antarctica; not only is it scenic, but the protected waters are usually as still as a lake, a rare occurrence in the storm-wracked southern seas, and the north-south traverse delivers vessels close to Petermann Island for landings. The principal difficulty is that icebergs may fill the channel, especially in early season, obliging a ship to backtrack and go around the outside of Booth Island to reach Petermann.

See also
Nimrod Passage
Una Peaks

References
 SCAR Composite Gazetteer of Antarctica.

Straits of Antarctica
Graham Coast
Tourism sites in Antarctica